José Levi Mello do Amaral Júnior (born 22 June 1976) is a Brazilian jurist. He has a career as Attorney for the National Treasury, as an acclaimed legal expert and professor and held the office of Attorney General for Brazil and Acting Minister of Justice and Public Security between February and March 2017, after the nomination of former minister Alexandre de Moraes to the Supreme Federal Court. He was also Attorney General for the National Treasury and is a licensed professor at the Law School of the University of São Paulo (USP).

Biography

Academic life
Levi Mello is Master of State Law and Law Theory by the Federal University of Rio Grande do Sul and Doctor of State Law by the University of São Paulo. He has been professor of Constitutional Law at the Law School of the University of São Paulo since 2008. He is also professor of post-graduation at the Centro de Ensino Unificado de Brasília (UniCEUB).

Public career
Amaral was a government employee at the Chief of Staff between the governments of Fernando Henrique Cardoso and Luiz Inácio Lula da Silva, as well as at the State Secretariat of Finances of Minas Gerais, during the government of Aécio Neves. He was special advisor of José Serra when he was Governor of São Paulo and commanded the juridical advisory of the Secretariat of Micro and Small Business of the Presidency of the Republic, under the administration of Guilherme Afif Domingos, in the government of Dilma Rousseff. José Levi had been also Consultant General for the Union between June 2015 and May 2016, before assuming a seat at the Ministry of Justice and Public Security as Executive Secretary, the "Number 2" of the office, from May 2016 to November 2017.

When the former minister Alexandre de Moraes licensed, on 7 February 2017, Amaral Júnior assumed as Acting Minister, until the sworn-in of Osmar Serraglio, on 7 March 2017.

Attorney for the National Treasury by career since July 2000, he had been Deputy Attorney General for Tax and Social Security Consulting at the Attorney General's Office for the National Treasury from 7 February 2018 to 3 January 2019, when he was nominated for the office of Attorney General for the National Treasury.

Mello was confirmed by president Jair Bolsonaro as new Attorney General for Brazil, after André Luiz Mendonça was moved to the Minister of Justice and Public Security.

References

|-

|-

1976 births
Living people
Government ministers of Brazil
University of São Paulo alumni
Federal University of Rio Grande do Sul alumni
Brazilian jurists
Ministers of Justice of Brazil
Academic staff of the University of São Paulo
Attorneys General of Brazil